Mehdi Bakeri (‎; 1954 – 16 March 1985) was an Iranian war hero in the Iran–Iraq War. He graduated in Mechanical Engineering from the University of Tabriz. During the Iranian revolution of 1979 he joined the protesters. After the beginning of the Iran–Iraq War he joined to the Sepah. He became martyr in a combat by Iraqi troops in eastern Iraq.

Early life 
Bakeri was born in Miandoab, West Azerbaijan Province in a religious Iranian Azerbaijani family. He lost his mother when he was a child. His brother actively participated in opposition groups that opposed the Shah's regime and finally was killed by the regime. Bakeri might have entered these groups through his brother. After graduating from high school he was accepted by the University of Tabriz in Mechanical Engineering. When he entered the university, he continued his activities against the regime. Bakeri and his friends played an important role in holding protests against regime in Tabriz. According to classified documents, he was under surveillance of West Azerbaijan's SAVAK.

Career 
After the victory of the Islamic Revolution and formation of the Islamic Revolutionary Guard Corps, he joined this institution. Bakeri served as mayor for nine months and later as the public prosecutor of Urmia, West Azerbaijan.

His wedding party was the same day as the start of Iran–Iraq War. He left his family to join the Iranian forces in the battlefront just two days later. He was appointed as the commander of the 31st Ashura Division, and showed great courage and bravery in combat against the Iraqi forces.

Operations 
Bakeri participated in several operations:
 Operation Beit ol-Moqaddas
 Operation Dawn (1983)
 Operation Dawn 2
 Operation Dawn 3
 Operation Dawn 4
 Operation Fath ol-Mobin
 Operation Kheibar
 Operation Ramadan

Death 
In Operation Badr (1985), like most of the time, he was in the most dangerous region of the battlefront. He got martyred by Iraqi troops north of the Iraqi city of Al-Qurnah. The boat which was carrying his corpse, sunk in the river of Tigris after being hit by an Iraqi RPG. His body was never found.

Memorial 
He is highly revered as one of the greatest Iranian war heroes. Bakeri Expressway, in western Tehran, has been named after him. Tractor Stadium, in Tabriz, has also been renamed after him as "Tractor's Shahid Bakeri Stadium".

In popular culture

The Situation of Mehdi 

The Situation of Mehdi is a 2022 film about Mehdi Bakeri, directed by Hadi Hejazifar and written by Hejazifar & Ebrahim Amini. The film won the Crystal Simorgh for Best Film, Best First Film, Best Original Score, Best Sound Recording and Best Special Effects at the 40th Fajr Film Festival. It scored the most nominations—14—and has received 5 awards (the most wins).

See also
 Ahmad Kazemi
 Mohammad Ebrahim Hemmat
 Ali Hashemi (Commander)

References

External links
 .

Iranian military personnel killed in the Iran–Iraq War
Iranian prosecutors
1954 births
1985 deaths
University of Tabriz alumni
People from Miandoab
Recipients of the Order of Fath
Mayors of places in Iran
People from Urmia
Imperial Iranian Army conscripted personnel